The Shantar Sea is a small coastal sea in the northwestern Sea of Okhotsk.

It is bounded to the north by Bolshoy Shantar Island, to the east by Malyy Shantar Island, and to the south by Tugur Bay.

History

The sea was frequented by American whaleships hunting bowhead whales between 1853 and 1874. Russian schooners from Mamga also cruised for bowheads in the sea from 1865 to 1871.

References

Bodies of water of the Sea of Okhotsk
Seas of the Pacific Ocean
Seas of Russia
Shantar Islands
Bodies of water of Khabarovsk Krai
Pacific Coast of Russia